Ruby is the third studio album by the Albany-based pop rock band Sirsy. It was released on May 18, 2004.

Track listing
"By July" - 3:41
"Hostage" - 4:01
"Fine" - 4:05
"Pet" - 3:59
"Lie To Me" - 4:10
"Soul Sucker" - 3:43
"Spark" - 3:37
"Me And My Ego" - 3:16
"Again" - 4:52
"Blacker Than Blue" - 4:16

External links

References

2004 albums
Sirsy albums